Gernot Sick (born October 31, 1978 in Judenburg) is a retired Austrian international footballer. He had to retire at the age of 28 after numerous knee operations.

References

1978 births
Living people
Austrian footballers
Austria international footballers
Grazer AK players
SW Bregenz players

Association football midfielders